Regulo Caro (born November 5, 1981) is a Mexican singer and songwriter.

Biography
He was born and raised in Cajeme, Mexico and grew up in Ciudad Obregón Mexico. Descended from musicians, uncles and grandparents, since he was a small child, he showed his strong inclination towards music, so at the age of 13 he decided to form a band. At 16, he had some experience at parties and meetings. He finished his bachelor's degree in Business Administration, which he only practiced for a few months, since his desire for music was latent. As a composer, he has worked with important exponents of Mexican regional music such as his cousin Gerardo Ortiz, Los Nuevos Rebeldes, Banda MS, Raúl Hernández, Los Buitres de Culiacán, Alfredo Olivas.

Caro is one of the most popular artists of the Regional Mexican genre and has received countless awards, including a Latin Grammy nomination, a BMI award, gold record, a star on the Las Vegas Walk of Stars, among others. His albums have positioned themselves in the Top 5 of the Regional Mexican Albums list of Billboard magazine and their songs have reached the first places of the lists of popularity.

Discography
Música, Pólvora y Sangre (December 17th,2010) 
Amor en Tiempos de Guerra (February 28th, 2012)
Especialista (August 27th.2013)
Mi Guitarra y Yo Vol. 1 (July 29th, 2014)
Senzu-Rah (October 27th, 2014)
Mi Guitarra y Yo Vol. 2 (November 24th, 2015)
En Estos Dias (October 7th, 2016)
Mi Guitarra y Yo Vol. 3 (January 19th, 2018)
Emilio Garra (October 11th, 2019)
Mi Guitarra Y Yo Vol. 4 (December 19th, 2019)
Regulo Caro vs. Emilio Garra (January 27th, 2022.)
''El cocho (April 3, 2022.)
El Amor Del GIGI (February 14th. 2023)

Awards and nominations
The Latin Grammy Awards are awarded by the Latin Academy of Recording Arts and Sciences. Similar to the Grammy Award. Régulo Caro has received one nomination.

References

1981 births
Living people
Singers from California
People from California
Norteño musicians
Banda musicians
Latin music songwriters
21st-century American singers